Sheikh Hasina Medical University, Khulna ;(Common known as Khulna Medical University) is a Government Medical University situated in Khulna, Bangladesh. It has been established for the supervisors of all medical colleges and nursing colleges of Khulna division.

History
The Prime Minister's Office (PMO) approved the proposal of establishing Sheikh Hasina Medical University in Khulna.

Background
Sheikh Hasina Medical University, established in Khulna division to supervise whether these public and private medical institutions will be functioning properly. In this, Sheikh Hasina Medical University will be responsible for the medical and dental colleges, nursing colleges, institute of health technology (IHT), medical education institutes.

List of vice-chancellors 

 Md. Mahbubur Rahman ( 2020 – present )

Faculties and departments

Faculty of Medicine
Present Dean- Professor Dr. Md. Din-Ul Islam

Faculty of Surgery

Faculty of Basic Science and para clinical Science
Present Dean - Prof. Dr. Bappa Gautam

Faculty of Dental

Faculty of Nursing

Faculty of Biotechnology and Biomedical Engineering

Faculty of Medical Technology

Faculty of Preventive and Social Mediciney

Affiliated Colleges 

 Khulna Medical College, Khulna
 Jashore Medical College, Jashore
 Kushtia Medical College, Kustia
 Satkhira Medical College, Satkhira
 Magura Medical College, Magura
 Gazi Medical College, Khulna
 Ad-Din Akij Medical College, Khulna 
 Khulna City Medical College, Khulna 
 Ad-Din Sakina Woman's  Medical College, Jashore 
 Khulna Nursing College , Khulna 
 Khulna Mamota Nursing College, Khulna

References 

Education in Khulna
Educational institutions established in 2019
2019 establishments in Bangladesh
Public Medical University of Bangladesh
Medical universities in Bangladesh